Danylo Lazar (born 30 December 1989) is a professional Ukrainian football defender playing with FC Vorkuta in the Canadian Soccer League.

Playing career 
Lazar began his career in 2009 with FC Lviv in the Ukrainian First League, but played with their reserve team FC Lviv-2 in the Ukrainian Second League. In 2010, he had a brief stint with FC Dynamo Khmelnytskyi, before returning to Lviv the following season. After his tenure in Lviv he had stints with FC Hirnyk-Sport Komsomolsk, FC Stal Kamianske, FC Mykolaiv, and NK Veres Rivne. In 2016, he went overseas to Canada to sign with FC Ukraine United of the Canadian Soccer League.

In 2017, after the relegation of FC Ukraine to the Second Division he signed with FC Vorkuta. Throughout the season he assisted in securing the regular season title. He returned to play with Vorkuta for the 2019 season.

Honors

FC Vorkuta 
 Canadian Soccer League First Division (1): 2007

References

External links 
Profile on Official FC Lviv Website
Profile at Official FFU Site

1989 births
Living people
Ukrainian footballers
FC Lviv players
FC Lviv-2 players
FC Dynamo Khmelnytskyi players
FC Hirnyk-Sport Horishni Plavni players
FC Stal Kamianske players
FC Mykolaiv players
NK Veres Rivne players
FC Ukraine United players
FC Continentals players
Canadian Soccer League (1998–present) players
Association football defenders
Ukrainian expatriate sportspeople in Canada
Ukrainian expatriate footballers
Expatriate soccer players in Canada
Ukrainian Second League players
Sportspeople from Lviv